Hesme is a surname. Notable people with the surname include:

Annelise Hesme (born 1976), French actress
Clotilde Hesme (born 1979), French actress